Santiago Chacón (born 30 May 1992) is an Argentine professional footballer who plays as an attacking midfielder for Italian Serie D side FBC Gravina.

Career
Huracán gave Chacón his professional debut in Primera B Nacional on 12 May 2012 versus Patronato, having previously selected him as a substitute for two games in the past season's Argentine Primera División. He remained with Huracán for three seasons and made a total of eight appearances. On 11 September 2014, Chacón joined Ermionida of the Greek Football League. Twenty-eight appearances, the last of which came against Episkopi on 14 June, followed during 2014–15 as Ermionida were relegated. August 2015 saw Chacón sign for Uruguay's Villa Teresa. His first appearance was against El Tanque Sisley on 19 September.

Like with Ermionida, the one campaign spent with Villa Teresa, the 2015–16 Uruguayan Primera División season, ended with relegation. On 30 June 2016, Chacón joined Argentine Primera División side San Martín. Two years later, following just three matches for San Martín, Chacón agreed to join Santamarina of Primera B Nacional. He appeared just once for the club, featuring for the final thirty minutes of a goalless draw with Arsenal de Sarandí on 1 September 2018. He left at the end of the year. In January 2020, Chacón joined Welsh Cymru North club Bangor City. He netted goals against Corwen and Conwy Borough.

On 24 July 2020, Chacón signed a two-year contract with Sambenedettese of Italy's Serie C. His first appearance came in a Coppa Italia first round loss to Alessandria on 23 September.

On 16 September 2021, he moved to FBC Gravina in Serie D.

Career statistics
.

References

External links

1992 births
Living people
Footballers from Buenos Aires
Argentine footballers
Association football midfielders
Argentine expatriate footballers
Expatriate footballers in Greece
Expatriate footballers in Uruguay
Expatriate footballers in Wales
Expatriate footballers in Italy
Argentine expatriate sportspeople in Greece
Argentine expatriate sportspeople in Uruguay
Argentine expatriate sportspeople in Wales
Argentine expatriate sportspeople in Italy
Argentine Primera División players
Primera Nacional players
Football League (Greece) players
Uruguayan Primera División players
Cymru North players
Serie C players
Serie D players
Club Atlético Huracán footballers
A.E. Ermionida F.C. players
Villa Teresa players
San Martín de San Juan footballers
Club y Biblioteca Ramón Santamarina footballers
Bangor City F.C. players
A.S. Sambenedettese players